Association Sportive Police, commonly referred to as AS Police, is  a Nigerien association football club based in Niamey and sponsored by the Nigerien National Police. Founded in 1993, AS Police won the Niger Premier League and the Niger Cup double in 2008.

Achievements
Niger Premier League: 1
 2008.

Niger Cup: 1
 2008.

Niger Super Cup: 0

Performance in CAF competitions
CAF Champions League: 1 appearance
2009 - Preliminary Round

CAF Confederation Cup: 1 appearance
2022 - First Round

References

Law enforcement in Niger
Football clubs in Niger
Super Ligue (Niger) clubs
Sport in Niamey
Association football clubs established in 1993
1993 establishments in Niger
Police association football clubs